Terry Maple (born September 10, 1946) is an American behavioral research scientist, wildlife conservationist, Professor Emeritus (Georgia Institute of Technology) and zoo director emeritus.

Maple has authored or co-authored 12 academic books, including Zoo Man, an autobiography detailing the early years of his career as a zoo director. His second autobiography, Professor in the Zoo, was published in August 2016. Most recently, he co-authored with Dan Marston, Comparative Psychology for Clinical Psychologists and Therapists (Kingsley, London, 2016).

Maple is best known for his 18-year tenure as director, and later President and CEO, of Zoo Atlanta. He is credited with transforming the troubled zoo into a model institution and fiscally sound cultural attraction.

Career

President/CEO, Zoo Atlanta
In 1984, Atlanta Mayor Andrew Young appointed Maple, then a 38-year-old animal behaviorist, to serve as interim director of the Atlanta Zoo. An investigation revealed the facility was in disrepair and plagued with problems from political infighting to scandal. In addition, the zoo's membership was revoked by the Association of Zoos and Aquariums, the national zoo association and regulatory body. Maple was appointed interim director and ultimately director.

That same year, the zoo was listed in Parade magazine as one of the ten worst zoos in the United States. The negative publicity prompted a strong public outcry from the community, and increased a growing public sentiment that the facility should be closed down.

In 1985, the management of zoo operations was put in the hands of a new private non-profit organization, the Atlanta-Fulton County Zoo, Inc, with Maple responsible for overseeing all departments from animal care and veterinary services to fundraising. In addition to privatization, the zoo was rebranded Zoo Atlanta.

Under Maple's leadership, the reputation of Atlanta's metropolitan zoo was restored and the zoo became a popular cultural attraction and pioneering zoological facility in terms of the management and study of endangered  wildlife species. Zoo Atlanta also extended its contributions to the local community beyond the perimeter of the zoo campus. In partnership with Atlanta's WSB-television the zoological organization won six Emmy Awards for local educational programming.

Maple retired from Zoo Atlanta in 2003 as the founding President and CEO and assumed the title of Zoo Director Emeritus.

Animal welfare science in zoos
Maple developed an organizational culture and instituted practices at Zoo Atlanta whereby evidence-based methods were starting to be employed. Other institutions have benefitted from research published by staff at Zoo Atlanta, while some zoos have begun to adopt their own model of using animal welfare research to improve animal care at their respective facilities.  
In many ways Zoo Atlanta has emulated modern day natural history museums, which have traditionally been considered more scholarly and scientific than zoos. Most museums employ curatorial staff with courtesy research and teaching appointments at universities.  Zoo Atlanta is one of the few zoos in the industry to have followed this approach in an effort to foster research activities and cultivate practices based on science. A few institutions have research departments and university partnerships, but through Maple's dual appointment he was able to establish a unique relationship between zoos and local universities.

President, Association of Zoos and Aquariums
As President of the Association of Zoos and Aquariums (AZA) in 1998-9, Maple established the association's first diversity initiative and widened the membership's scientific network and reputation within the academic research community. He also worked to differentiate AZA accredited zoos and aquariums from roadside attractions and other menageries.

Founding Editor, Zoo Biology
Maple is the founding editor of the scientific journal Zoo Biology, which was originally published by John Wiley/Blackwell in association with the AZA. When Maple retired from editorial roles with Zoo Biology, he was bestowed the title of Editor Emeritus of the Journal, along with Donald Lindburg of the Zoological Society of San Diego and Dan Wharton, formerly of the Chicago Zoological Society.

Research

Great ape research
As an internationally recognized expert on the behavior, welfare, and conservation of great apes, Maple was poised to develop ethological programming for Zoo Atlanta's innovative lowland gorilla exhibit. He designed an exhibit which offered opportunities for rigorous study of primate behavior in a conventional primate laboratory, while providing a visitor experience that was immersive, engaging and educational to patrons. Today, Zoo Atlanta's gorilla exhibit is acknowledged as one of the most important gorilla facilities in the world.

Over a span of more than 15 years, the partnership between Georgia Tech and Zoo Atlanta permitted Maple and his staff to successfully advance lowland gorilla conservation, exhibition, husbandry, propagation and research, for which the Zoo won the AZA's prestigious Edward H. Bean Award. The Zoo's success with great apes was made possible by a partnership with Yerkes National Primate Research Center of Emory University which loaned the gorillas and orangutans to the Zoo. The Zoo's gorilla exhibit is sponsored by Ford Motor Company and branded as the Ford African Rain Forest. It is the first exhibit designed for a population of gorillas distributed in four contiguous groups.

Recent career endeavors

Professor-in-Residence, San Francisco Zoo
Maple served from 2011 to 2014 as the San Francisco Zoo’s first "Professor-in- Residence" and the architect of their unique "Stanton Family Wellness Initiative" including applications to exhibit and facility design.

Consultant, Jacksonville Zoo
In his current engagement as Professor-in-Residence, Maple is a mentor to keepers, curators, and veterinarians at the Jacksonville Zoo and Gardens. As a Scholar-in-Residence, he will also teach and mentor graduate students in two departments at the University of North Florida.

President/CEO Palm Beach Zoo
In 2005, Maple was granted a formal leave of absence from Georgia Tech to become the President/CEO of the Palm Beach Zoo. On Earth Day 2009, the Palm Beach Zoo opened the innovative Melvin J. and Claire Levine Animal Care Complex, including a state-of- the-art animal hospital and the innovative Center for Conservation Medicine. Equipped with solar power provided by a grant from the Florida Power & Light Foundation, the U.S. Green Building Council certified the building LEED Gold, the first LEED-certified zoo veterinary hospital in the nation.

The Community Foundation of Palm Beach and Martin County honored the Palm Beach Zoo as its "Sustainability Leader" among 59 competing non-profits in the region, confirming the zoo's growing leadership role in sustainability. Maple retired as CEO of the Palm Beach Zoo in 2011. He resumed his affiliation with Florida Atlantic University and finished his thirteenth book, Zoo Animal Welfare (co-authored with Bonnie Perdue) published by Springer-Verlag in 2013.

References

1946 births
Living people
American conservationists
Behaviourist psychologists
Georgia Tech faculty
People from Chula Vista, California
Zoo directors